NGC 51 is a lenticular galaxy in the constellation Andromeda. It has a diameter of 90,000 light-years. The galaxy was discovered on September 7, 1885 by Lewis Swift, who described it as "Pretty faint, pretty small, round, brighter middle."

See also 
 Lenticular galaxy 
 List of NGC objects (1–1000)
 Andromeda (constellation)

References

External links 
 
 
 SEDS

0051
00974
Lenticular galaxies
Andromeda (constellation)
18850907
Discoveries by Lewis Swift